Ghalil    is a village in Khwahan Badakhshan Province in north-eastern Afghanistan.

See also
Badakhshan Province

References

External links
" N, 70°23'18" E:Ghalīl.Maps

Populated places in Khwahan District